Staggs may refer to:

People 
 Barbara Staggs (1940–2014), American educator and legislator in the Oklahoma House of Representatives
 Erv Staggs (1948–2012), American professional basketball player
 Jeff Staggs (1944–2014), American college and professional football player
 Jimmy Staggs (1935–2007), American disc jockey and record store owner in Chicago, Illinois
 Kotoni Staggs (born 1998), Australian professional rugby league footballer
 Monica Staggs (born 1970), American stuntwoman and actress
 Steve Staggs (born 1951), American Major League Baseball player
 Suzanne Staggs, American physicist and professor
 Thomas O. Staggs (born 1961), former Chief Operating Officer of The Walt Disney Company

See also 
 Staggs–Huffaker Building, commercial building in Beebe, Arkansas
 Stagg, people with a similar surname
 Stag (disambiguation)